First Baptist Church of Deanwood is a Baptist church at 1008 45th Street in Northeast, Washington, D.C., in the Deanwood neighborhood.

It was built in 1938, and added to the National Register of Historic Places in 2008. It was added to the District of Columbia Inventory of Historic Sites the same year.

A new church was completed in 1961, just south of the old church.  The new church is now the main location for worship services and the old building is used for youth activities.

References

External links
 
 
 The First Baptist Church of Deanwood on The Black Churches Network
 First Baptist Church of Deanwood, Washington DC on Flickr

Baptist churches in Washington, D.C.
Churches on the National Register of Historic Places in Washington, D.C.
Churches completed in 1938
District of Columbia Inventory of Historic Sites